Fleming-Mason Airport  is a public use airport located in Mason County, Kentucky, United States. It is seven nautical miles (13 km) north of the central business district of Flemingsburg, a city in Fleming County. The airport is owned by the Fleming-Mason Airport Board.

Although most U.S. airports use the same three-letter location identifier for the FAA and IATA, this airport is assigned the identifier FGX by the FAA but has no designation from the IATA.

Facilities and aircraft
It has one asphalt paved runway designated 7/25 which measures 5,001 by 100 feet (1,524 x 30.48 m).

For the 12-month period ending May 10, 2007, the airport had 15,800 aircraft operations, an average of 43 per day: 98% general aviation and 2% military. At that time there were 24 aircraft based at this airport: 96% single-engine and 4% multi-engine.

References

External links
 Aerial photo as of 18 February 1995 from USGS The National Map
 
 

Airports in Kentucky
Buildings and structures in Mason County, Kentucky
Transportation in Fleming County, Kentucky
Transportation in Mason County, Kentucky